Jouko Hassi (born November 19, 1959 in Rantsila) is a Finnish former sprinter. His club team was Oulun Pyrintö.

He competed in 100 metres and 4 x 100 metres relay at the 1983 World Championships, but was eliminated in the heats on both occasions.

Personal bests
 100m: 10.45 in Ylivieska, 1984
 200m: 21.26 in Budapest, 1981

Progression 100m

References
 
 Tilastopaja Oy

1959 births
Living people
People from Siikalatva
Finnish male sprinters
Sportspeople from North Ostrobothnia